2004 Denmark Open is a darts tournament, which took place in Denmark in 2004.

Results

References

2004 in darts
2004 in Danish sport
Darts in Denmark